Rostam Rud (also Romanized as Rostam Rūd) is a village in Natel Kenar-e Sofla Rural District, in the Central District of Nur County, Mazandaran Province, Iran. At the 2006 census, its population was 2,556, in 713 families.

References 

Populated places in Nur County